This is a list of large and international corporations with Canadian headquarters in Mississauga, Ontario, Canada. Companies founded or based in Mississauga are also included.

Companies founded or based in Mississauga

Alectra
Atomic Energy of Canada Limited
Bell Mobility
Canada Dry Motts
Candu Energy Inc.
Carrier Enterprise Canada
East Side Mario's
EllisDon
First Choice Haircutters
Grocery Gateway
Hatch Ltd
Highland Farms
IMAX Corporation
Kelseys Original Roadhouse
Laura Secord Chocolates
Maple Leaf Foods
Metroland Media Group
Molly Maid
Morguard
Pressure Pipe Inspection Company
Softron
Second Cup
Shaw Broadcast Services
The Shopping Channel
TST-CF Express
Winners

Canadian headquarters of international Fortune 500 companies

Abbott Laboratories
ADM Milling
Agilent Technologies
Air Products Canada
Alcoa Fastening Systems
Amgen Canada
Anixter Canada
Ashland Canada
AVNET International Canada
Baxter Corporation
Boston Scientific
Chevron Texaco Lubricants
Citi
ConAgra Foods
DuPont
Eastman Chemical
Ecolab
Expeditors International
Federal Express
First Data
General Electric
General Mills
Gilead Sciences
Hershey
Hewlett-Packard
Honeywell
Ingram Micro
Kellogg
Kimberly-Clark
Konica Minolta
Marriott Lodging
Masco
Mascot Truck Parts
Mattel
Medtronic
Microsoft
Moores
NetSuite
NCR
Newell Rubbermaid
Nissan
Office Depot
Oracle Corporation
Paccar
PepsiCo
Pitney Bowes
Praxair
Prologis
Ryder
Sara Lee Coffee & Tea
Sealed Air
Sherwin-Williams
Smurfit-MBI
Staples
Tech Data
Thermo Fisher Scientific
United Parcel
Wal-Mart
Wells Fargo
Western Digital
Whirlpool Corporation
Wyeth Consumer Health Care
YRC Logistics

References

Mississauga